Scincella vandenburghi, also known commonly as the  Korean skink, the Tsushima ground skink, and the Tsushima smooth skink, is a species of skink, a lizard in the family Scincidae. The species is endemic to East Asia

Geographic range
S. vandenburghi is found on the Korean peninsula and on Tsushima Island, Japan.

Taxonomy
Scincella vandenburghi may be a synonym of Scincella modesta.

Etymology
S. vandenburghi is named after John Van Denburgh, curator of herpetology at the California Academy of Sciences.

Habitat
S. vandenburghi inhabits temperate forests where it can be found on the forest floor.

Reproduction
S. vandenburghi is oviparous, laying one to nine eggs in early summer.

References

Further reading
Park J, Koo K-S, Kim I-H, Park D (2016). "Complete mitochondrial genomes of Scincella vandenburghi and S. huanrenensis (Squamata: Scincidae)". Mitochondrial DNA Part B Resources 1 (1): 237–238.
Schmidt KP (1927). "Notes on Chinese Reptiles". Bull. American Mus. Nat. Hist. 54 (4): 467–551. (Leiolopisma vandenburghi, new species, p. 501).

Scincella
Reptiles of Japan
Reptiles of Korea
Lizards of Asia
Reptiles described in 1927
Taxa named by Karl Patterson Schmidt